KNDE (95.1 FM) is a radio station with a Top 40 (CHR) format licensed to College Station, Texas.

Candy 95's current line-up features the show "Morning Candy" with Frito and Katy (6-10am), Mid-Days with Audrey Rose (10am-2pm), and Afternoons with Ted (2-7pm). It is owned and operated by Bryan Broadcasting Company through its licensee Bryan Broadcasting License Corporation, based locally in College Station, Texas.  Its studios are in College Station and its transmitter is in Bryan.

History
The station began broadcasting on August 8, 1964 as WTAW-FM on 92.1 FM. The station was originally a Top 40/CHR station known as "92W", and was once the dominant CHR station for the College Station area until the launch of KKYS in November 1984. In 1982, the station's call-letters were changed to KTAW-FM, and in 1987, the station started to slowly downgrade its Top 40 format for adult contemporary and changed its call-letters to KTSR. It was known as "Star 92". This lasted until 1991 as the station then flipped to classic rock. Its format would later shift to mainstream rock by the 2000s as "92 Rock". KTSR then flipped to KNDE in March 2003. Some former programs contain a morning zoo, which is simply entitled The Morning Zoo with Mason and Mack, Lesley K in middays, Jerry Kidd in the afternoons and Tripp Daily at night.

Former logos

Former DJs
Krash 
Elizabethany
Bobby Mason
Scotty Mack
Bo-Bo the Monkey Boy
Lesley K
Tripp Daily
Jerry Kidd
Tic-Tac
Maddie
Brad Mitchell
Mike Retro
Lindsey Hall
Adam Knight
Ebony Williams
Rick Lavere
Catnip
Nick J

HD Radio
In 2009, KNDE began broadcasting in HD with side channels. The HD1 rebroadcasts the analog signal of KNDE.

KNDE-HD2
KNDE-HD2 airs 80's and 90's classic country on "Willy 97.7."

KNDE-HD3
KNDE-HD3 airs a Regional Mexican format known as "La Jefa 102.7".

References

External links
Bryan Broadcasting Stations
Station Website

FCC History Cards for KNDE

NDE
Contemporary hit radio stations in the United States
Radio stations established in 1964